Gouden Ezelsoor ("Golden Donkey Ear") was an award for the best-selling literary debut in the Netherlands. It was first awarded in 1979 and last awarded in 2008.

Recipients 

 1979: Monica Sauwer for Mooie boel
 1980: Alexander van Es for Anatomie van het gevoel
 1981: Richard Steegen for Pakken...gepakt
 1982: Annie van de Oever for Dame in broekpak
 1983: two recipients
 René Stoute for Op de rug van vuile zwanen
 Veronica Hazelhoff for Nou moe!
 1984: Tessa de Loo for De meisjes van de suikerwerkfabriek
 1985: Adriaan van Dis for Nathan Sid
 1986: Fleur Bourgonje for De terugkeer
 1987: Rudi van Dantzig for Voor een verloren soldaat
 1988: Hanny Alders for Non nobis
 1989: Margriet de Moor for Op de rug gezien
 1990: Lisette Lewin for Voor bijna alles bang geweest
 1991: Ernst Timmer for Het waterrad van Ribe
 1992: Connie Palmen for De wetten
 1993: Ronald Giphart for Ik ook van jou
 1994: Kader Abdolah for De adelaars
 1996: Arnon Grunberg for Blauwe maandagen
 1997: Ineke Holtwijk for Kannibalen van Rio
 1998: Lulu Wang for Het lelietheater
 1999: Jessica Durlacher for Het geweten
 2000: Erwin Mortier for Marcel
 2001: Maya Rasker for Met onbekende bestemming
 2002: Khalid Boudou for Het schnitzelparadijs
 2003: Judith Koelemeijer for Het zwijgen van Maria Zachea
 2004: not awarded
 2005: Annelies Verbeke for Slaap!
 2006: Gerbrand Bakker for Boven is het stil
 2007: not awarded
 2008: Christiaan Weijts for Art.285b

References 

1979 establishments in the Netherlands
2008 disestablishments in the Netherlands
Awards disestablished in 2008
Awards established in 1979
Dutch literary awards